ASG Juventus de Sainte-Anne is a football club in Guadeloupe, based in the city of Sainte-Anne.

They play in Guadeloupe's first division, the Guadeloupe Division d'Honneur.

Achievements
Guadeloupe Championnat National: 8
 1966–67, 1968–69, 1972–73, 1973–74, 1974–75, 1975–76, 1978–79, 1999–00

Coupe de Guadeloupe: 6
 1955, 1958, 1970/71, 1975, 1976, 1978

Football clubs in Guadeloupe